Catherine Panter-Brick is the Bruce A. and Davi-Ellen Chabner Professor of Anthropology, Health, and Global Affairs at Yale University, where she directs the Program on Conflict, Resilience, and Health and the Program on Stress and Family Resilience.  She is also the senior editor (medical anthropology) of the interdisciplinary journal Social Science & Medicine and the President-Elect of the Human Biology Association.  She serves as head of Morse College, one of Yale’s 14 residential colleges.

Background and education 
As a medical anthropologist, Panter-Brick was trained in both human biology and the social sciences.  Her current research addresses issues of risk and resilience in contexts of war, forced displacement, famine, poverty, and social marginalization.  She has directed more than forty interdisciplinary research projects in Afghanistan, Ethiopia, the Gambia, Jordan, Mexico, Nepal, Niger, Pakistan, Saudi Arabia, Tanzania, and the UK. She publishes extensively in biomedical and social sciences journals, and has co-edited seven books, most recently Medical Humanitarianism  and Pathways to Peace.

Career 
Panter-Brick holds a joint appointment at Yale University in the Department of Anthropology and the Jackson Institute for Global Affairs, and a secondary appointment at the School of Public Health.  She actively serves on the Steering Committee of the Yale Women’s Faculty Forum (WFF) and the Global Health Initiative (GHI), and leads the Early Childhood Peacebuilding Consortium with other faculty at Yale and the United Nations to disseminate scientific research and advocate for better policies on violence prevention.  Prior to coming to Yale, she was a professor of anthropology at Durham University and a Fellow at St Hugh's College, Oxford.  She has also been appointed a senior research fellow in the Crisis Prevention & Post-Conflict Unit of Agence Française de Développement (AFD) and a research associate of the Centre National de la Recherche Scientifique (CNRS). She also leads research initiatives to develop effective partnerships between scholars, practitioners, and policy-makers. An example of recent work strengthening the evidence base for mental health and resilience interventions in humanitarian crises was funded by the Wellcome Trust and the UK Government under the Elrha’s R2HC Program.

Her teaching at Yale includes interdisciplinary courses on global health equity, humanitarian interventions, conflict and resilience.  She has organized many Colloquia on the themes of Social Justice, Solidarity, and Forced Migration, Health and Humanitarian Action, Social Innovation, Violence and Agency.  On the issue of resilience and forced migration, she has been a keynote speaker at the United Nations, contributed to national and international media broadcasts, and presented at international iNGO dissemination events, the World Health Organization, the World Bank, and the United States Institute of Peace.

Featured work 
Professor Panter-Brick directed more than 40 interdisciplinary research projects that address issues of risk and resilience in contexts of war, displacement, famine, and poverty. She has global collaborations with scholars at over 60 different universities in the last 4 years, established through fieldwork and publications. Panter-Brick has authored more than 140 peer-reviewed scientific publications in the biomedical, health, and social sciences, and coedited seven books.

Honors and awards 
For her work in humanitarian and conflict areas such as Niger and Afghanistan, Panter-Brick was awarded the  Lucy Mair Medal & Marsh Prize for Applied Anthropology by the Council of the Royal Anthropology Institute of Great Britain and Ireland. This awards honors excellence in the application of anthropology to the relief of poverty and distress and to the active recognition of human dignity. She has also been appointed a senior research fellow in the Crisis Prevention & Post-Conflict Unit of Agence Française de Développement (AFD) and a research associate of the Centre National de la Recherche Scientifique (CNRS).

Personal life 
She is married to Mark Eggerman and has two sons, Dominic and Jannik.

Publications 
Panter-Brick is the author of seven co-edited books and 140 peer-reviewed articles.

References 

Living people
Yale University faculty
American women anthropologists
Year of birth missing (living people)
Alumni of the University of Oxford
American women academics
21st-century American women